The Devil Mountain Run is a 5K/10K foot-race held annually in Danville, California since 1978.

History
It was begun as a fundraiser for the Rowan Branch of Children's Hospital Oakland by local volunteers Nancy Lewis and Jacquie Graham.

The first race was held as a 10K on May 21, 1978.  All of the following races were held on the first Sunday in May.  The initial race drew 2,000 participants and, at its peak, the Devil Mountain Run had over 10,000 runners. The original course (1978 to 1999) began and ended at the Town and Country Shopping Center as the competitors ran through Danville neighborhoods.  Beginning in 2000, the start of the race was moved to what was then the Andronico's grocery store on Railroad Avenue.  The 10K course was modified so that it no longer spent as much time in the neighborhoods.  The first half of the 10K was mostly on San Ramon Valley Boulevard and the last half was spent on the Iron Horse Trail, a popular biking and jogging trail.

Over the 30-plus years of the race, over $2 Million was raised for Children's Hospital Oakland. The race survived near-cancellation at least three times—twice in the 1990s  and also in 2006. The final Children's Hospital Oakland sponsored race was held on May 1, 2011, as the hospital elected to  focus their fundraising efforts elsewhere. Forward Motion Sports sponsored a free 5K/10K for 2012  and is one of the sponsors for the relaunched 2013 Devil Mountain Run 5K/10K race to be held on May 5, 2013.

References

Foot races in California
Sports in Contra Costa County, California